Sonneberg I is an electoral constituency (German: Wahlkreis) represented in the Landtag of Thuringia. It elects one member via first-past-the-post voting. Under the current constituency numbering system, it is designated as constituency 19. It covers the southern part of the Sonneberg district, including the city of Sonneberg.

Sonneberg I was created for the 1994 state election. Since 2009, it has been represented by Beate Meißner of the Christian Democratic Union (CDU).

Geography
As of the 2019 state election, Sonneberg I covers the southern part of the Sonneberg district, specifically the municipalities of Bachfeld, Föritztal, Frankenblick, Schalkau, and Sonneberg.

Members
The constituency has been held by the Christian Democratic Union since its creation in 1994. Its first representative was Christine Zitzmann, who served from 1994 to 2009. Since 2009, it has been represented by Beate Meißner.

Election results

2019 election

2014 election

2009 election

2004 election

1999 election

1994 election

References

Electoral districts in Thuringia
1994 establishments in Germany
Sonneberg (district)
Constituencies established in 1994